Pochep is a town and the administrative center of Pochepsky District in Bryansk Oblast, Russia, located  southwest of Bryansk, the administrative center of the oblast. Population:

History

The origin of Pochep is unknown but it was mentioned in the 15th century as an important town of the Grand Duchy of Lithuania. It fell into the hands of the Grand Duchy of Moscow in 1503. Pochep was returned to the Polish–Lithuanian Commonwealth under the terms of the Truce of Deulino. It was part of the Smolensk Voivodeship. Pochep remained of little significance until 1709, when Hetman Ivan Skoropadsky made a grant of it to Alexander Menshikov. The latter founded the fort of Alexandropolis in the vicinity and launched manufacture of sails for Russian ships in Pochep.

The industry declined following Menshikov's downfall and the town stagnated until 1750, when it passed to another Hetman, Kirill Razumovsky, who planned to build his summer residence there. The only monument to these plans is the Resurrection Church, built in the 1750s to a confident Baroque design and often attributed to Antonio Rinaldi.

During World War II, Pochep was occupied by the German Army from August 22, 1941 to September 21, 1943.
According to the Soviet archives, 1,875 Jews, including men, women, and children, were murdered during the Holocaust, mainly in the shootings of March 1942.

Administrative and municipal status
Within the framework of administrative divisions, Pochep serves as the administrative center of Pochepsky District. As an administrative division, it is incorporated within Pochepsky District as Pochepsky Urban Administrative Okrug. As a municipal division, Pochepsky Urban Administrative Okrug is incorporated within Pochepsky Municipal District as Pochepskoye Urban Settlement.

Notable people
Pavel Axelrod, Russian Menshevik, was born here in 1850.
Matvey Blanter, Russian composer, famous for the song "Katyusha", was born here in 1903.
Roman Konoplev, Russian politician and publicist, was born here in 1973.

See also
Vialky

References

Notes

Sources

External links
 The murder of the Jews of Pochep during World War II, at Yad Vashem website.

Cities and towns in Bryansk Oblast
Smolensk Voivodeship
Mglinsky Uyezd
Holocaust locations in Russia